Aarhus is an H chondrite meteorite that fell to earth on 2 October 1951 at 18:15 in Aarhus, Denmark. The meteor split just before the otherwise undramatic impact and two pieces were recovered. They are known as Aarhus I (at 300g) and Aarhus II (at 420g). Aarhus I was found in the small woodland of Riis Skov, just a few minutes after impact.

Classification
It is an H chondrite and belongs to the petrologic type 6, so it was assigned to the H6 group.

See also 
Glossary of meteoritics
 Meteorite falls
 Ordinary chondrite

References

Sources 
 

Meteorites found in Denmark
1951 in Denmark